Pastel de Tentúgal (Tentúgal Pastry) is a Portuguese pastry originating in Tentúgal, in the municipality of Montemor-o-Velho. This conventual sweet was first created sometime in the 16th century by Carmelite nuns.

References

Portuguese cuisine
Portuguese desserts
Custard desserts
Egg dishes